A list of animated television series first aired in 2005.

See also
 List of animated feature films of 2005
 List of Japanese animation television series of 2005

References

Television series
Animated series
2005
2005
2005-related lists